Heradida is a genus of spiders in the family Zodariidae. It was first described in 1893 by Simon. , it contains 8 African species.

Species
Heradida comprises the following species:
 H. bicincta Simon, 1910 — South Africa
 H. extima Jocqué, 1987 — South Africa
 H. griffinae Jocqué, 1987 — Namibia
 H. loricata Simon, 1893 (type) — South Africa
 H. minutissima Russell-Smith & Jocqué, 2015 — Tanzania
 H. quadrimaculata Pavesi, 1895 — Ethiopia
 H. speculigera Jocqué, 1987 — South Africa
 H. xerampelina Benoit, 1974 — South Africa

References

Zodariidae
Araneomorphae genera
Spiders of Africa